Anniversary is the fifth studio album by Japanese singer Akina Nakamori. It was released on 1 May 1984 under the Warner Pioneer label. It was released on her second debut anniversary. The album includes the hit singles "Kita Wing" and first song written by Akina herself, Yume wo Misasete.

Background
Anniversary is the first studio album released in 1984.

The music production team consist of a long-term collaborators from Nakamori's debut times, such as a Mitsuo Hagita, siblings Etsuko and Takao Kisugi, Amii Ozaki, Kōji Tamaki (a future member of Anzen Chitai), Keiko Miura and Haruomi Hosono.

Unlike previous album New Akina Etranger, which had heavy influence of later's Momoe Yamaguchi music production team and European-oriented album style, Anniversary has more summer and tropical style according to interview from the magazine The Television.

Promotion

Single
"Kita Wing" was released on 1 January 1984, her first single in 1984. The single debuted at number two on the Oricon Single Weekly Chart and became the ninth best-selling single of 1984. In the Best Ten ranking, it debuted at number one and stayed at number 11 in the yearly chart.

It received three rewards: special composition award in the 4th Japan Composition Award, Best Hit Award in the 13th FNS Music Festival and Best Singing Award in the 26th Japan Record Awards.

On 15 December 1984, "Kita Wing" was released as a special edition Kita Wing/Refrain.

Stage performances
In the  TBS television program The Best Ten, she performed Kita Wing five times.

The most of the songs has been performed in the live tour Ongaku Kanshō-kai: Aitaina Aerukana, such as Easy, Asylum, Shut Out, 100 Celsius Vacation, Natsu Basama, Yume wo Misasete and Melancholy Fiesta.

Kita Wing was performed in Bitter and Sweet in 1985, Akina Index: The 8th Anniversary in 1989, Akina Yume Special Live in 1991, Symphonic Concert in 1998 and AKINA NAKAMORI A-1 tour in 2004.

Mabushii Futari was performed in the Akina's first dinner show Xmas An evening with Miss Akina Nakamori in 1996.

Asylum was performed in the Akina Yume Special Live in 1991 and in the special cover live Empress at CLUB EX in 2005.

Chart performance
The album reached number one on the Oricon Album Weekly Chart for three consecutive weeks, charted 21 weeks and selling over 483,400 copies. The album was ranked at number 13 on the Oricon Album Yearly Chart in 1984.

Track listing

Covers
Japanese singer-songwriter, Takao Kisugi covered Mabushii Futari de in his solo album Labyrinth in 1984.

References

1984 albums
Akina Nakamori albums
Warner Music Japan albums
Japanese-language albums